Chirundu may refer to:
Chirundu, Zambia, town on the northwest bank of the Zambezi river
Chirundu, Zimbabwe, village on the southeast bank of the Zambezi river
Chirundu Bridge, connecting Chirundu, Zambia with Chirundu, Zimbabwe
Chirundu (constituency), a parliamentary constituency in Zambia